Alexei Tsvetkov may refer to:

 Alexei Tsvetkov (poet) (1947–2022), Russian poet and essayist
 Alexei Tsvetkov (sculptor) (1924–2009), Russian sculptor
 Alexei Tsvetkov (ice hockey) (born 1981), Russian ice hockey forward

See also
 Alexander Tsvetkov (1914–1990), Bulgarian chess master